European University of Madrid (Universidad Europea de Madrid in Spanish language, UEM) is a private university in Madrid, Spain.

History

Founded in 1995, the school was purchased in 1999 by Sylvan Learning Systems, Inc.  In 2004, Sylvan Learning Systems later changed its name to Laureate Education Inc.

During 2010/2011 the University has adapted almost all the teachings it offers to the European Higher Education Area.

Rectors

External links
 Official website

For-profit universities and colleges in Europe
Universities in the Community of Madrid
Educational institutions established in 1995
Private universities and colleges in Spain
1995 establishments in Spain

Universities and colleges in Spain